Football Club Grenoble Basket was a French basketball club that was based in Grenoble, France. The club is now disbanded.

History 
The club was a section of the multi-sports club FC Grenoble. It was two-time champion of France, in 1942–43 and 1943–44. The club played in the top-tier level championship of French basketball, the Pro A, starting in 1920, and it was also known mostly for the great performances in the period between 1940–44, counting among its members several renowned players, including Robert Busnel. After the liberation by the Allied troops (1944), the club was disbanded, but the team moved with much of its workforce and was "recreated" in Lyon.

The new club, with the new name of Éveil Lyon, became the champions of France in 1946. Two years later, that club would merge with AS Villeurbanne to form a new multi-sports club whose basketball section, now known as ASVEL Basket, would go on to win a record 18 French championships.

Honours 

French League
 Winners (2): 1942–43, 1943–44

Notable players 
  Robert Busnel
  Wladimir Fabrikant

References

Basketball teams in France
Basketball teams established in 1911
Sport in Grenoble
Sport in Lyon